M. Christian is an author and anthologist working in a variety of genres including horror, science fiction, erotica and crime. Much of his work combines sexual themes with the horror or science fiction genre.

Selected bibliography
Among his works are:

 The Bachelor Machine (collection, 2003),
 Amazons:  Tales of Strong Women 
 Blood Lust: Erotic Vampire Tales (Paperback) 
 Confessions: Admissions of Sexual Guilt (Paperback) 
 More Extreme Stories about Extreme Sex, Vol. 2

Plot summaries
 Running Dry (novel, 2006)
 Running Dry concerns a painter, who receives a letter he last saw in 1913, at current moment of his death.

  Amazons:  Tales of Strong Women
  Tales of Strong Women examines "the common thread of women exhibiting strength and power".

 Blood Lust: Erotic Vampire Tales (Paperback)
 Who would know vampires have other things on their mind other than blood? 

 Confessions: Admissions of Sexual Guilt (Paperback)
 Confessions: Admissions of Sexual Guilt looks at several writers' exploration of sexual confessions' impact.

See also
 Sex in science fiction
 List of horror fiction authors

References

External links
 M. Christian's homepage

21st-century American novelists
American crime fiction writers
American erotica writers
American horror writers
American male novelists
American science fiction writers
Living people
Science fiction editors
American male short story writers
21st-century American short story writers
21st-century American male writers
Year of birth missing (living people)